Beaver Bay may refer to:

Places
 Beaver Bay, Minnesota, U.S.
 Beaver Bay Township, Lake County, Minnesota, U.S.
 Beaver Bay (Alaska), site of the Blue Fox shipwreck in 1937

Geology
Beaver Bay Complex, a rock formation in Minnesota, U.S.
Beaver Bay Group, is a geologic group in Alaska, U.S.

See also

Beaver, Bay County, Michigan, U.S.